The Bahr el-Baqar primary school in the Egyptian village of Bahr el-Baqar (south of Port Said, in the eastern province of Sharqia) was bombed by the Israeli Air Force on 8 April 1970, killing 46 children. Of the 130 children who attended the school, 46 were killed and over 50 wounded. The school itself was completely demolished. The attack was carried out by Israeli Air Force F4 Phantom II fighter bombers, at 9:20 am on Wednesday 8 April. Five bombs and two air-to-ground missiles struck the single-floor school, which consisted of three classrooms.

There has been significant dispute between both parties as well as their allies over the motive of the attack and, consequently, its appropriate designation. While Egyptian and Arab sources regard the attack as a deliberate massacre and war crime intended to impose a ceasefire, Israeli and Western sources consider it to be a human error on the Israeli side made under the impression that the school was an Egyptian military installation.

The attack was conducted as part of a series of deep penetration strikes named Operation Priha, which also included the earlier bombing of Abu Zaabal factory, where 80 civilian workers were killed. While the Abu Zaabal bombing was immediately stated by the Israeli government to be mistake, the bombing of Bahr El-Baqar was repeatedly defended by then-Defense Minister Moshe Dayan, and Israeli envoy to the UN Yosef Tekoah, at the time. Official sources claimed to have collected images of the school by reconnaissance satellite consistent with military settings and that some students were receiving military training.

Background

The bombing occurred during the War of Attrition (1967–1970) as part of Operation Priha's deep penetration strategy which aimed to relieve the conflict along the line of contact on the Suez Canal by striking deep targets and to urge Nasser into a truce.

Aftermath
When asked about the incident, Moshe Dayan said: "We have checked and re-checked and there was no mistake this time" and "Maybe the Egyptians put elementary students in a military base." Speaking about the incident, Egyptian commander Abdelatim Ramadan said: "Actually, two targets were hit by the Israelis. The first target was a group of military bases about 30 km from the Suez Canal, which were targeted before, on the night of 18–19 December 1969. The second target was the Bahr El-Baqar primary school."

The attack is considered a contributing factor to Israel's decision to suspend other deep strikes originally planned in operation Priha.

In 2016, reports circulated about prospective reimbursements for the historical killings being planned to further promote Egypt–Israel relations.

References

External links
Remembering 8 April 1970: The Bahr Al-Baqar School Bombing Tragedy. Egyptian Streets.

1970 in Egypt
1970 in Israel
Airstrikes in Africa
Egypt–Israel relations
School bombings
War of Attrition
April 1970 events in Africa
Massacres committed by Israel
Sharqia Governorate
Massacres in Egypt
Massacres in 1970